Julio and Marisol was a bilingual (English/Spanish) public-service advertising campaign that ran in the New York City Subway, promoting condom use to prevent AIDS. The well-known catchphrase was a line from the first installment, in which Marisol sobs, "I love you, but not enough to die for you".

The campaign has been described as "one part steamy soap opera, one part language instruction, and two parts AIDS education service", and as a "HIV melodrama".  With action covering just a few days, the story was told at a rate of about one episode per year from 1989 to 1997.

Storyline 
The story follows two young lovers for several days while they argue about the dangers of unprotected sex during the AIDS epidemic.  The action played out in slow motion, with nine episodes posted in subway cars at a rate of approximately one per year.  Heterosexual HIV transmission, homosexuality, serial transmission through multiple sexual partners, intravenous drug abuse, and condom use were all explored through frank discussions between the protagonists and their circle of friends and relatives.

Opening scenes 
Episodes 1-6 take place in a single evening.  The story opens with the couple getting ready to have sex for the first time (episode 1).  Marisol insists that Julio use a condom, pleading "I love you, but not enough to die for you".  Julio is offended by the suggestion and storms out.

After leaving Marisol (episode 2), Julio goes to see his friends Marco and Miguel, discovering that both of them use condoms.  Miguel laments that his cousin Anita has recently died of AIDS and her partner Raul is very sick, speculating that condom use might have saved them both.  In parallel, Marisol calls her friend Iris (episode 3), who tells her about Anita and Raul.  Marisol visits Raul at the hospital, where he urges her to protect Julio and herself from infection by using condoms.

Julio leaves Marco and Miguel, and encounters his younger brother, Luisito, with some of his friends (episode 4).  They are going to "see some ladies".  Julio lectures them about condom use, to which Luisito replies that they learned about AIDS and condoms in school.  We then see Julio, by himself, thinking how smart his kid brother is, and realizing he needs to talk with Marisol.

Back at Raul's hospital room (episode 5) Julio shows up and apologizes to Marisol; they profess their love for each other and leave.  Rosa enters and tells Raul that she is HIV positive.  Raul has just asked Rosa if she has told Julio when Julio and Marisol return.  Rosa is introduced to Marisol as an old friend of Raul's (episode 6).  Julio again leaves with Marisol, and tells her that Rosa is just somebody he knew from the old neighborhood.  Meanwhile, back in the hospital room, Raul urges Rosa to let Julio know she is HIV positive.

Conclusion 
Episodes 7 and 8 take place another day when Julio and Marisol are apparently reunited.

In the morning, Julio leaves for work (episode 7), and Marisol telephones Iris again.  In this conversation, Marisol discovers that Rosa was not  just a casual acquaintance of Julio's, but actually a past lover and realizes that Julio lied to her.  She confronts Julio about his lying (episode 8).  Julio protests that it was a long time ago, and Marisol says she wants to go see Rosa.  Meanwhile, Rosa has seen a counselor and is ready to talk to Julio about being HIV positive. Julio and Marisol go to Rosa's apartment, where Rosa tells them both that she is HIV positive.  Marisol wonders if Julio is also positive.

Epilogue 
An unpublished episode 9 takes place after Raul's death.  The thoughts of friends and family at the funeral are shown.  A man wonders if he should get tested for HIV.  Another man is determined this will never happen to him.  A woman laments that Raul's womanizing and drug use finally caught up with him.  A priest remembers Raul as an altar boy.  The funeral director observes that he never had so many funerals for young people before the AIDS epidemic.

An untitled episode on the NYC Health blog shows Julio having a conversation with an HIV counselor, after having had an HIV test, which showed him to be negative.  The conversation covers what Julio needs to do to remain negative, and touches on the fact that Julio's brother is gay.  Julio calls Marisol to tell her that he tested negative.

Significance 
The first clinical reports of AIDS (although not by that name) were in 1981.  Early cases were observed in homosexual men, intravenous drug users, hemophiliacs, and Haitians.  By the mid to late 1980s, the virus that caused the disease was identified, the outbreak had grown into an epidemic beyond the original patient populations, and the mode of transmission was understood to be exchange of bodily fluids.  The use of condoms was known to be an important tool for reducing transmission of the virus, but stereotypical behavior inhibited condom use in the Hispanic population.  This led to an advertising campaign specifically designed to reach a Hispanic audience.

James Baron of The New York Times described the series as "one part steamy soap opera, one part language instruction, and two parts AIDS education service".  Matthew Schneier of New York Magazine called it an "HIV melodrama".  The Cooper Hewitt Museum has the series in their permanent collection, and it was featured in the National Library of Medicine's "AIDS is Not Over" exhibition.

Health Commissioner Benjamin Mojica was quoted as saying, "The situations in the story are the kinds which people may see themselves in, situations which people can relate to".  The series is so well known, it has been used as translation practice text in courses teaching English as a second language to Spanish speakers.

Production history 
The campaign ran in the New York City subway from 1989 to 1997.  It was primarily targeted at young Hispanics, who the New York City Health Department felt were not receptive to existing outreach efforts. The series appeared in Spanish and English versions, titled La Decision and Decision, respectively.

Initially funded by a $60,000 Centers for Disease Control grant for public service announcements, it has since appeared in both print and broadcast versions, in comic book form, and printed on T-shirts.  The campaign was most well known for the print ads that ran in as many as 6,000 subway cars.   According to Adweek, the Julio and Marisol campaign spots were the subway's most frequently stolen poster.

The campaign was initially contracted to Conill, a Latino marketing agency, who determined that a photo-novella would be the best format for the target audience.  Conill's contract only covered the first episode, with subsequent episodes managed internally by the Health Department using freelance artists for the drawing.  Publication spanned the mayoralties of David Dinkins and Rudy Giuliani, with Margaret Hamburg serving as Commissioner of Health under both administrations and assistant health commissioner Ann Sternberg managing the series.
In 1995, a new advertising policy was instituted for the subway; large customers could purchase all the available space on each side of a car, with 20% of the cars were reserved for smaller advertisers.  Sternberg felt that this would be inappropriate for the campaign and "categorically refused to occupy that space". The New York Times noted that "she didn't want Julio and Marisol appearing among ads aimed at hemorrhoid sufferers or people with foot-odor problems".  As  a result, the series was halted, with eight episodes having been published, and a ninth already prepared.

The series returned in 1997 when negotiations between the Health Department and the Metropolitan Transit Authority provided a path for the spots to appear in 60% of the subway's cars.

References 

HIV/AIDS in the United States
Public health in the United States
Sex education in the United States
Advertising campaigns